Languages of Nepal constitutionally called Nepalese languages are the languages having at least an ancient history or origin inside the sovereign territory of Nepal spoken by Nepalis. The 2011 national census lists 123 languages spoken as a mother tongue (first language) in Nepal. Most belong to the Indo-Aryan and Sino-Tibetan language families.

The official working language at federal level is Nepali, but the constitution provisions each province to choose one or more additional official working languages. The Language Commission of Nepal on 6 Sept 2021 recommended 14 official languages for different provinces of Nepal.

The mother languages of Nepal, or languages of Nepali origin are sometimes referred to as Nepali languages.

National languages
According to the constitution of Nepal, "all languages spoken as the mother tongues in Nepal are the languages of the nation". Many of the languages also have various dialects. For example, the Rai community has about 30 languages. Some of the languages are similar and may be considered as a dialect but sometimes the distinction between dialects or completely different languages is unclear and might differ in opinions from person to person.

Classification
Nepal's languages are mostly either Indo-European or Sino-Tibetan, while only a very few of them are Austro-Asiatic and Dravidian.

Out of 123 languages of Nepal, the 48 Indo-European languages, which are of the Indo-Aryan (Indic) sub-family (excluding English), constitute the largest group in terms of the numeric strength of their speakers, nearly 82.1% of population. Nepali, Bhojpuri, Maithili, Awadhi,   Tharu languages, Urdu, etc. fall in this group.

The Sino-Tibetan family of Nepal's languages forms a part of its Tibeto-Burman group. Though spoken by relatively fewer people than the Indo-European family (17.3% of population), it includes a greater number of languages, about 63 languages. Languages belonging to this group are Tamang, Nepal Bhasa (Newar), Magar, Limbu, etc.

The small declining number of Dravidian languages are represented by Kurux, and the Munda languages of the Austroasiatic family by Santali and Mundari.

The indigenous languages of Nepal that predated the influx of Indic, Tibeto-Burman, and other families barely survive in the Kusunda language, which is nearly extinct today.

Nepal also has at several indigenous village sign languages: Jhankot Sign Language, Jumla Sign Language, and Ghandruk Sign Language, in addition to the Nepali Sign Language designed for national use.

Constitution

Part 1 of the Constitution of Nepal 2015 (2072 B.S.) contains these provisions about the languages of Nepal:
Article 6: All native languages spoken in Nepal are National languages of Nepal.
Article 7a: Nepali language in Devanagari script is used for Nepal government work.  (Indigenous languages also are to be written using Devanagari.)
Article 7b: Beside Nepali language, the Provinces can choose one or more other languages spoken by majority population of that province for government work.

Languages in Nepal by numbers of speakers
According to the 2011 national census, Nepali native speakers make up less than half the population, about 44.6%. Most of the languages in Nepal are endangered because out of the 129 languages, only 19 of them have more than 100,000 speakers. Those languages are spoken by 95.91% of the total population.

The 2019 annual report of the Language Commission of Nepal registered six languages not previously counted: Rana Tharu, Nar Phu, Chum (Syaar), Nubri (Larke), Poike and Serake (Seke). These languages are spoken in the districts of Kanchapur, Manang, Gorkha, Dolpa, and Mustang respectively.

Official languages

Nepali in Devanagari script is the official working language in federal level. The constitution has provisioned provinces to choose one or more than one official language(s) besides Nepali. According to the Language Commission of Nepal Maithili and Limbu are recommended to have official status in Province No. 1; Maithili, Bhojpuri and Bajjika in Province No. 2; Tamang and Nepal Bhasa in Bagmati Province; Magar and Gurung in Gandaki Province; Tharu and Awadhi in Lumbini Province; Nepali (Khas Bhasa)'s Karnali dialect and Magar in Karnali Province; Dotyali and Tharu in Sudurpashchim Province.

Scripts
Most of the languages are found exclusively in oral form. According to the Language Commission, fifteen scripts are currently in use in Nepal, including the following:
 Devanagari script
 Dham script
 Kaithi script
 Khema script
 Limbu script
 Magar Akkha script
 Mithilakshar script
 Nepal scripts
 Ol Chiki script
 Tamyig script

See also 
Ethnic groups in Nepal

Further reading
Hale, Austin. 1973. Clause, sentence, and discourse patterns in selected languages of Nepal IV: word lists. SIL and Tribhuvan University Press (CLDF dataset on Zenodo )

References

 
Nepalese culture